Black Cyclone is a 1925 American silent Western film directed by Fred Jackman featuring Rex the King of Wild Horses.

Plot
As described in a film magazine review, Rex, a wild horse of the plains, pays court to The Lady, an aristocratic mare, but loses her when they meander into the valley where Joe Pangle holds reign with his herd of horses. Pangle puts up a fight and conquers Rex. Rex retreats to a stream and gets caught in some quicksand. He is rescued when Jim Lawson aids the horse from the waters using his own hands. That night Rex drives off a pack of wolves that had attacked Lawson, and Rex later fights off a mountain lion to save the man's life. Jane Logan is pursued by Pangle when Lawson takes after them on his horse. Lawson's horse is shot, and Rex permits him to get on and ride. Rex watches Lawson and Pangle battle, and the spirit of the fight enters the horse and he again attacks Pangle. Lawson and Rex win. The Lady returns to Rex and Jane returns to Lawson.

Cast
 Guinn "Big Boy" Williams as Jim Lawson 
 Kathleen Collins as Jane Logan
 Christian J. Frank as Joe Pangle
 Noah Young as Cowboy (uncredited)

References

External links

 

1925 films
1925 Western (genre) films
American black-and-white films
Pathé Exchange films
Silent American Western (genre) films
Films directed by Fred Jackman
1920s American films